John Wells Pratt House, also known as Pratt House Museum, is a historic home and museum located at Fulton in Oswego County, New York. Built in 1863, it is a large two story residence in the Italianate style.

The house is rectangular in plan with a three bay wide, three bay deep hipped roof main block with a gabled two story service wing. It features a cupola with round arched windows.  A finely detailed Queen Anne style porch was added about 1880.

It was listed on the National Register of Historic Places in 1999.

References

External links
Pratt House Museum - official site
John Wells Pratt House - Fulton, NY - U.S. National Register of Historic Places on Waymarking.com

Houses on the National Register of Historic Places in New York (state)
Historic house museums in New York (state)
Italianate architecture in New York (state)
Houses completed in 1863
Houses in Oswego County, New York
Museums in Oswego County, New York
National Register of Historic Places in Oswego County, New York